United Nations Security Council Resolution 289, adopted unanimously on November 23, 1970, following several previous incursions into the Republic of Guinea by Portuguese troops, the Council demanded the immediate withdrawal of all external armed forces, mercenaries and military equipment and decided that a special mission, to be formed after consultation between the President of the Security Council and the Secretary-General, would be sent to the territory.

See also
 List of United Nations Security Council Resolutions 201 to 300 (1965–1971)
 Portuguese Empire
 Portuguese Guinea
 Portuguese invasion of Guinea (1970)

References
Text of the Resolution at undocs.org

External links
 

 0289
 0289
 0289
 0289
1970 in Portugal
Portuguese Guinea
November 1970 events